Motiram Gajanan Rangnekar (M. G. Rangnekar) (Devanagari: मोतीराम गजानन रांगणेकर) (10 April 1907 – 1 February 1995) was a Marathi writer from Maharashtra, India. He received the Sangeet Natak Akademi Award (1982) for his playwriting.

References 

Marathi-language writers
Indian male dramatists and playwrights
Recipients of the Sahitya Akademi Award in Marathi
20th-century Indian dramatists and playwrights
1907 births
1995 deaths
Dramatists and playwrights from Maharashtra
20th-century Indian male writers
Recipients of the Sangeet Natak Akademi Award